Xylota stenogaster is a species of hoverfly in the family Syrphidae. It can be found within Mexico.

References

Eristalinae
Insects described in 1892
Diptera of North America
Taxa named by Samuel Wendell Williston